Daocheng Yading Airport is an airport serving Daocheng County in the Garzê Tibetan Autonomous Prefecture of Sichuan province, China.

Construction started after the airport was approved in April 2011, with a total investment of 1.58 billion yuan (US$255 million). The airport was opened on 16 September 2013. The inaugural flight was Air China Flight 4215 on an Airbus A319 from the provincial capital Chengdu, carrying 118 passengers. The opening of the airport cut the journey time between Daocheng and Chengdu to one hour, which previously required a two-day bus trip.

Facilities
It has a  terminal building that is shaped like a flying saucer with two aerobridges. It is designed to handle 280,000 passengers per year.

Airlines and destinations

See also
List of airports in China
List of the busiest airports in China
List of highest airports

References

External links
Photos of the airport on its opening day
Video of take off: https://www.youtube.com/watch?v=GgJdVgoF3m0

Airports in Sichuan
Buildings and structures in the Garzê Tibetan Autonomous Prefecture
Airports established in 2013
2013 establishments in China